Bermuda competed in the first 1930 Games and has competed in a total of seventeen of the twenty  Commonwealth Games to date. Bermuda took part in the 1986 Games opening ceremony and in the opening day of competition before the Bermuda Olympic Association decided to formally withdraw.

Overall medal tally
With five medals, Bermuda is forty-second in the All-time tally of medals after the 2018 Games.

See also
All-time medal tally of Commonwealth Games

References